This is a list of episodes for the 1979–1985 CBS action-adventure/comedy series The Dukes of Hazzard. The show ran for seven seasons and a total of 147 episodes. Many of the episodes followed a similar structure: "out-of-town crooks pull a robbery, Duke boys blamed, spend the rest of the hour clearing their names, the General Lee flies and the squad cars crash". Also, almost every episode would begin with the Duke boys driving along in the General Lee, whether running an errand or just out on a leisurely drive, and inadvertently stumbling upon one of the sheriff's speed traps.

Series overview

Episodes

Season 1 (1979)

Season 2 (1979–80)
Starting with this season, a new closing sequence was introduced. This time, it shows the General Lee and Enos' police car going around in circles. This remained in use until the end of the series in 1985. Also at the beginning of this season, the show is now produced by Lou Step Productions.

Season 3 (1980–81) 
This season consisted of 23 episodes.
Season 3 brought a big change to the show.  Sonny Shroyer, who played the part of Deputy Enos Strate, was leaving the show to star in a short-lived Dukes of Hazzard spin-off series, called Enos. Rosco's pet dog Flash was introduced in this season. Flash would stay until the end of the series in 1985.
In the second episode, Enos was written out of the show as moving to California to take a job with the Los Angeles Police Department. This is the last season to use the Season 2 closing theme.
During the opening credits, Enos is out, and Cletus Hogg (Rick Hurst) is in.

Season 4 (1981–82)

Season 5 (1982–83) 
Byron Cherry and Christopher Mayer were promoted to opening titles starting with this season.
Beginning with season 5, over a royalties dispute, John Schneider (Bo Duke) and Tom Wopat (Luke Duke) were fired from the series. They were replaced by their cousins Coy Duke and Vance Duke. The show's ratings nosedived and, after 18 episodes, Wopat and Schneider were hired back.   
According to the series bible, Luke and Bo's 18-episode absence was due to their competing (and, ultimately, winning big) in the NASCAR circuit. Their return episode has the distinction of featuring all four Duke boys.
This season consisted of 22 episodes.
Sonny Shroyer returns as Enos for the rest of the series after the cancellation of the spin-off Enos.

Season 6 (1983–84)

Season 7 (1984–85)

References

External links
 

Episodes
Lists of American comedy-drama television series episodes